The Uhangri Formation, located at the Uhangri Dinosaur Fossil Site, is a geological formation from which fossil pterosaur tracks have been recovered near Haenam-eup, Jeollanam-do, South Korea.

Uhangri Dinosaur Fossil Site 

The Uhangri Dinosaur Fossil Site area was originally covered by ocean, uncovered when Lake Damsuho, and surrounding area, was created by the construction of the Geumho Tide project.

Embedded in the rock formations around the lake are fossilized footprints of dinosaurs, pterosaurs and water birds that lived in this area tens of millions of years ago.

No other place in the world has fossil footprints of all these different dinosaurs found in a single area.

Fossil contents

Pterosaur tracks 
Pterosaur tracks from the Uhangri Formation are housed at the Dinosaur Tracks Museum, of the University of Colorado at Denver and Chonnam National University, Gwangju, South Korea.

Dinosaur tracks

Arthropod tracks

Paleoflora

See also 
 List of fossil sites

References

Bibliography 

 Lockley, M.; Harris, J.D.; and Mitchell, L. 2008. "A global overview of pterosaur ichnology: tracksite distribution in space and time." Zitteliana. B28. p. 187-198. 
 K.-G. Hwang, M. Huh, M. G. Lockley, D. M. Unwin, and J. L. Wright. 2002. New pterosaur tracks (Pteraichnidae) from the Late Cretaceous Uhangri Formation, southwestern Korea. Geological Magazine 139:421-435
 Y.-N. Lee and M. Huh. 2002. Manus-only sauropod tracks in the Uhangri Formation (Upper Cretaceous), Korea and their paleobiological implications. Journal of Paleontology 76(3):558-564
 Y.-N. Lee, K.-M. Yu, and C. B. Wood. 2001. A review of vertebrate faunas from the Gyeongsang Supergroup (Cretaceous) in South Korea. Palaeogeography, Palaeoclimatology, Palaeoecology 165:357-373
 S.-Y. Yang, M.G. Lockley, R. Greben, B.R. Erickson, and S.-K. Lim. 1995. Flamingo and duck-like bird tracks from the Late Cretaceous and Early Tertiary: evidence and implications. Ichnos 4:21-34

External links 
 Haenam Uhangri Dinosaur Museum

Geologic formations of South Korea
Upper Cretaceous Series of Asia
Campanian Stage
Santonian Stage
Sandstone formations
Shale formations
Lacustrine deposits
Ichnofossiliferous formations
Fossiliferous stratigraphic units of Asia
Paleontology in South Korea
Formations